Christian Roberto Alves Cardoso (born 19 December 2000), simply known as Christian, is a Brazilian footballer who plays as a midfielder for Athletico Paranaense.

Career statistics

Club

Honours
Athletico Paranaense
Campeonato Paranaense: 2019, 2020
Copa Sudamericana: 2021

References

External links
Athletico Paranaense official profile 

2000 births
Living people
People from Jundiaí
Brazilian footballers
Association football midfielders
Campeonato Brasileiro Série A players
Campeonato Brasileiro Série C players
Club Athletico Paranaense players
Esporte Clube Juventude players
Footballers from São Paulo (state)